The 1942 Harvard Crimson football team was an American football team that represented Harvard University during the 1942 college football season. In its eighth season under head coach Dick Harlow, the team compiled a 2–6–1 record and was outscored 123-52 by opponents.

Harvard played its home games at Harvard Stadium in the Allston neighborhood of Boston, Massachusetts.

Schedule

References

Harvard
Harvard Crimson football seasons
Harvard Crimson football
1940s in Boston